The N-Acetylglucosamine receptor is a receptor which binds N-Acetylglucosamine.

Studies 
The N-Acetylglucosamine (GlcNAc) receptor has been recently found to interact and bind with vimentins at the cell surface. Research indicates that the GlcNAc receptor can therefore be used to target vimentin-expressing cells for gene delivery via receptor-mediated endocytosis.

References

External links 
 

Lectins